The Bursa Museum of Turkish and Islamic Art is a museum located in the former medrese of Yeşil Complex, which was constructed within the order of the Ottoman Sultan Mehmed I in 1419.

History
The history of the museum dates back to 1904 when the first museum in Bursa was founded at Bursa Boys' Highschool to exhibit Islamic/Ottoman relics and archeological foundings which were unearthed within city's administrative boundaries. In 1929, the exhibit was moved to the present-day location of Bursa Museum of Turkish and Islamic Art. With a new building being prepared for the archeological displays in 1971, the original place within the Yeşil Complex remained a museum for Turkish and Islamic art.

See also
 Turkish and Islamic Arts Museum
 Yeşil Türbe
 Bursa Treasure
 List of Art Museums

References 

National museums in Turkey
Art museums and galleries in Turkey
Decorative arts museums
Turkish
Islamic museums in Turkey
Yıldırım, Bursa